Smith's dwarf chameleon or the Elandsberg dwarf chameleon (Bradypodion taeniabronchum) is a  species of lizard in the family Chamaeleonidae endemic to South Africa. It is one of the few chameleons that uses its color-changing ability to actively camouflage itself.

References

External links
 Search for Distribution of Bradypodion taeniabronchum

Bradypodion
Reptiles of South Africa
Reptiles described in 1931
Taxa named by Andrew Smith (zoologist)
Taxonomy articles created by Polbot